Andie Case (born June 12, 1992) is an American singer, songwriter, and model based in Seattle from Eugene, Oregon. 
She gained worldwide popularity after covering songs by popular artists on her YouTube channel, including Rixton and Jason Derulo, as well as performing her own songs.

Musical career 
Case started singing publicly during the fifth grade talent show and has pursued a musical career ever since. Case draws inspiration from singers such as Kelly Clarkson, Christina Aguilera, Hayley Williams, and Demi Lovato. She was part of the Girls Night In tour that began in 2014.

Case's original compositions are available on iTunes, while she continues to work on an EP release. Her song "Want To Want Me/I Want You To Want Me Mashup has been identified as number seven in the top ten Spotify "most viral" tracks of June 2015 in the United Kingdom. The single spent three weeks on the UK Singles Chart, peaking at number 24. Her "Know No Boundaries" solo tour, was held in 2016 and included bandmates Ajay Marshall and Naph Smith.

Competitions and reality shows 
In 2015, Case was mentored by Dave Navarro in an episode of Breaking Band. The episode was screened in January 2016. The show focused on pairing established, famous musicians with emerging musicians.

On December 15, 2017, Case won the grand prize of US$1 million in Usher's Megastar Talent Competition, a mobile app-based competition.

Personal life 
She is one of seven children. When she released her original single, "Be Myself" on YouTube in April 2018, her summary noted that the song was about her bisexuality.

References

Further reading

External links

Official YouTube Page
Breaking Band episode on IMDb

1992 births
American women singer-songwriters
Living people
Musicians from Eugene, Oregon
Writers from Eugene, Oregon
Singer-songwriters from Oregon
21st-century American women singers
21st-century American singers
Bisexual musicians
Bisexual women